Frosty Returns is a 1992 American animated Christmas television special starring the voices of Jonathan Winters as the narrator and John Goodman as Frosty the Snowman. The special was directed by Bill Melendez and Evert Brown and features music by Mark Mothersbaugh. It was first aired on the CBS television network on December 1, 1992, and continues to be broadcast. It is the fourth special in a series beginning with Rankin/Bass Animated Entertainment's 1969 television adaptation of Steve Nelson and Jack Rollins' 1950 holiday song.

Plot
The special begins with a musical number showing that Beansboro Elementary School is canceled for the day due to a seven-inch snowfall. While the adults incessantly complain about the problems they have to deal with due to the snow and ice, the children enjoy the opportunity to play outside in the snow.

The scene then shifts to Holly DeCarlo, a depressed and lonely young girl and aspiring magician with only one friend, a tone-deaf nerd named Charles who has a knack for climatology. While practicing a magic act with Charles, the wind blows Holly's hat off her head, out the window, and onto a snowman who comes to life as Frosty, thus revealing that Holly's hat was "that old silk hat" featured in the original song and previous adaptations.

Meanwhile, a new product appears in Beansboro: an aerosol spray called "Summer Wheeze" that causes snow to instantly disappear, and thus poses a fatal threat to Frosty. Summer Wheeze's inventor, Mr. Twitchell, hopes to use the product to win over the people of Beansboro so that he will be crowned King of the Beansboro Winter Carnival, apparently believing that the title will give him actual dominion over them. At a presentation before the town council, a trustee voices concern about the environmental impact of the untested product; Mr. Twitchell orders his pet cat Bones to open a trapdoor beneath her seat.

To Twitchell's delight, and Frosty's dismay, the town of Beansboro embraces Summer Wheeze, putting Frosty's existence in jeopardy. When many of their classmates rally for the end of snow when in class the next day, only a day after singing about its virtues, Holly and Charles become Frosty's protectors, hiding him in a freezer and securing refuge for him in an ice castle built for the Carnival. Later, Holly gets Frosty to appear at the Winter Carnival in an attempt to persuade the townspeople that Twitchell's product is dangerous to the environment, hoping the citizens will rethink their dislike of snow.

Singing about the joy of winter, the townspeople are convinced and Frosty is unanimously declared king. A vengeful Twitchell tries to run over Frosty with his delivery truck but misses and falls in a frozen lake; now humbled, Frosty and Holly rescue him and let him wear the crown and cape as they all ride in the sled. Later Frosty must leave Beansboro, but he assures Holly that he will return someday.

Cast
 Jonathan Winters as The Narrator
 John Goodman as Frosty
 Elisabeth Moss as Holly DeCarlo
 Michael Patrick Carter as Charles 
 Brian Doyle-Murray as Mr. Twitchell
 Andrea Martin as Ms. Carbuncle
 Jan Hooks as Lil DeCarlo

Production
Contrary to its title and consistent pairing with the 1969 Frosty the Snowman special, the two were produced by different companies (Rankin/Bass produced the original, while this special was made by Lorne Michaels' Broadway Video, with help from longtime Peanuts director Bill Melendez, for CBS), and Frosty Returns makes no effort to establish itself in the 1969 special's fictional universe, using different characters, setting and voice actors. Because of Michaels' involvement, most of the cast consisted of sketch comedians from Michaels's other shows; Andrea Martin had starred in The Hart and Lorne Terrific Hour, while Jan Hooks and Brian Doyle-Murray were cast members on Saturday Night Live (a show where John Goodman had made frequent guest appearances). Since Broadway Video produced this special and owned the 1969 original prior to Golden Books' acquisition of the Videocraft International catalog in 1996, Frosty Returns follows the CBS showings of the original and is coupled with the original on all DVD releases; it was not included in the package sold to Freeform's 25 Days of Christmas cable telecasts, nor the package sold to AMC's Best Christmas Ever.

Music
Frosty Returns is a musical special, with two songs featured prominently on the soundtrack. "Frosty the Snowman" is featured at the beginning as an instrumental and sung by the entire cast at the end. "Let There Be Snow" is an original piece composed for the special, with three verses sung at various points in the special.

See also
Frosty's Winter Wonderland
 List of Christmas films

References

External links

 

1990s animated television specials
1990s American animated films
Television shows directed by Bill Melendez
Films scored by Mark Mothersbaugh
1992 television specials
1992 in American television
CBS television specials
Christmas television specials
CBS original programming
Frosty the Snowman television specials
1990s Christmas films
Animated Christmas television specials